In information security, intruder detection is the process of detecting intruders behind attacks as unique persons. This technique tries to identify the person behind an attack by analyzing their computational behaviour. This concept is sometimes confused with Intrusion Detection (also known as IDS) techniques which are the art of detecting intruder actions.

History 
Some other earlier works reference the concept of Intruder Authentication, Intruder Verification, or Intruder Classification, but the Si6 project was one of the first projects to deal with the full scope of the concept.

Theory 

Intruder Detection Systems try to detect who is attacking a system by analyzing his or her computational behaviour or biometric behaviour.

Some of the parameters used to identify a intruder 

 Keystroke Dynamics (aka keystroke patterns, typing pattern, typing behaviour)
 Patterns using an interactive command interpreter:
 Commands used
 Commands sequence
 Accessed directories
 Character deletion
 
 Patterns on the network usage:
 IP address used
 ISP
 Country
 City
 Ports used
 TTL analysis
 Operating system used to attack
 Protocols used
 Connection times patterns

Keystroke dynamics 
Keystroke dynamics is paramount in Intruder Detection techniques because it is the only parameter that has been classified as a real 'behavioural biometric pattern'. 

Keystroke dynamics analyze times between keystrokes issued in a computer keyboard or cellular phone keypad searching for patterns. First techniques used statistics and probability concepts like 'standard deviations' and 'Mean', later approaches use data mining, neural networks, Support Vector Machine, etc.

Translation confusion 
There is a confusion with the Spanish translation of 'Intrusion detection system', also known as IDS. Some people translate it as 'Sistemas de Detección de Intrusiones', but others translate it as 'Sistemas de Detección de Intrusos'. Only the former is correct.

See also 
Intrusion Detection
Intrusion-detection system
Biometrics

External links 
 P0f OS fingerprinting tool
 Si6 Paranoid Project

Computer security procedures